Icterica is a genus of the family Tephritidae, better known as fruit flies.

Species
Icterica circinata (Loew, 1873)
Icterica seriata (Loew, 1862)

References

Tephritinae
Diptera of North America